Alejandra Müller Arrieta (born October 29, 1997), known as Ale Müller, is a Mexican actress and singer. She was born in Mexico City, and first gained popularity for her debut role as Clara Licona in the Mexican sitcom La CQ.

She also voiced Valentina Luis in the film La leyenda de las momias de Guanajuato, and performed on stage in Santa Claus y la carta misteriosa.

In Italy she is known for playing Catalina in the telenovela Love Divina.

Filmography

Film 
 La Leyenda de las Momias (2014) - Valentina/Luis (voice)

Awards and nominations

References

External links

1997 births
Living people
Mexican actresses
Actresses from Mexico City
21st-century Mexican singers
21st-century Mexican women singers